Endotricha murecinalis is a species of snout moth in the genus Endotricha. It was described by George Hampson in 1916, and is known from New Guinea and Dorey Island.

References

Moths described in 1916
Endotrichini